This is a dated list of the brands owned by Nestlé globally. Overall, Nestlé owns over 2000 brands in 186 countries. Brands in this list are categorized by their targeted markets.

Beverages

 Bear Brand Sterilized
 Carnation	
 Caro (sold in the US as Pero) 
 Chuckie (Philippines)	
 cocoa D'Onofrio (Peru)	
 Dancow (Indonesia)
 Enviga (joint-venture with Coca-Cola, Beverage Partners Worldwide)
 Libby's
 Milo
 Nescau (Brazil)
 Nesquik
 Nestea (joint-venture with Coca-Cola, Beverage Partners Worldwide)
 Ovaltine (U.S. only)
 Ricacao (Ecuador)
 Romanette (Switzerland)
 Special.T
 San Pellegrino 
 Supligen (Caribbean) – milk beverage
 Sweet Leaf Tea

Coffee
 

 Blue Bottle Coffee Company
 Bonka
  (Portugal)
Chameleon Cold-Brew  
Christina (Portugal)
 Dolca (Argentina)
 Dolce Gusto
 Ecco (Chile, Peru)
 El Chaná (Uruguay)
 International Roast
 Kirma (Peru)
 Loumidis (Greece)
 Mountain Blend
 Nescafé
 Nespresso
 Partner's Blend 
 Ricoffy
 Ricoré
 Ristretto
 Sical
 Starbucks (Perpetual License)
 Sunrise (India)
 Taster's Choice
 Tofa
 Zoégas (Sweden)

Water

 S.Pellegrino (Italy)
 Acqua Panna (Italy)
 Alaçam (Turkey)
 Aqua Mineral (Poland)
 Aqua Pod
 Aqua Spring (Greece)
 Aquarel (Spain)
 Arctic (Poland)
 Baraka (Egypt)
 Buxton (UK)
 Charmoise (Belgium)
 Ciego Montero (Cuba)
 Contrex (France)
 Cristalp (Switzerland)
 Da Shan YunNan Spring (China)
 Dar Natury (Poland)
 Eco de los Andes (Argentina)
 Essentia (US)
 Erikli (Turkey)
 Frische Brise (Germany)
 Gerber (Mexico)
 Ghadeer (Jordan)
 Glaciar (Argentina)
 Henniez (Switzerland)
 Hépar (France)
 Hidden Spring (Philippines)
 Κorpi (Greece)
 La Vie (Vietnam)
 Levissima (Italy)
 Los Portales (Cuba)
 Minéré (Thailand)
 Nałęczowianka (Poland)
 Nestlé Selda (Portugal)
 Nestlé Vera (Italy)
 Neuselters (Germany)
 Pejo (Italy)
 Perrier
 Petrópolis (Brazil)
 Porvenir (Chile)
 Princes Gate (UK)
 Recoaro (Italy)
 San Pellegrino
 Santa Bárbara (Brazil)
 Santa Maria (Mexico)
 São Lourenço (Brazil)
 Sohat (Lebanon)
 Springs (Saudi Arabia)
 Valvert (Belgium)
 Viladrau (Spain)
 Vittel (France)
 Water Line (South Korea)
 Waterman (China)

Cereals

 Cerevita  (Zimbabwe)
 Cerelac (Pakistan)
 Cheerios (in some non-US markets)
 Chocapic
 Cini Minis
 Clusters
 Cookie Crisp (in non-US markets)
 Curiously Strawberry
 Curiously Cinnamon
 Estrelitas
 Fitness
 Force Flakes
 Gold Flakes
 Golden Grahams (in non-US/Canadian markets)
 Golden Morn (Nigeria)
 Golden Nuggets
 Honey Stars
 Koko Krunch (UNICEF) 
 Lion Cereal
 Milo cereals
 Nescau Cereal (Brazil)
 Nesquik Breakfast  Cereal
 Nestlé Corn Flakes
 Shredded Wheat (UK with General Mills)
 Shreddies (UK and Ireland)
 TRIO Cereal
 Trix (Philippines)
 Uncle Tobys

Chilled

 Chamyto (Brazil, Mexico, Chile)
 Chambinho (Brazil)
 Chandelle (Brazil, Chile)
 Chiquitín (Mexico, Chile)
 Club (Mexico)
 Hirz (Switzerland)
 La Laitière (France, Belgium, UK)
 La Lechera (Spain, Mexico)
 LC1 (Switzerland)
 Le Viennois (France, Belgium, Switzerland)
 Moça (Brazil)
 Molico (Brazil, now Svelty)
 Munch Bunch (UK)
 Nestlé
 Nesvita (India, Pakistan)
 Ninho (Brazil)
 Ski
 Sollys (Brazil)
 Sveltesse (France)
 Svelty (Mexico)
 Yoco

Chocolate, confectionery and baked goods

 Abuelita
 Aero
 After Eight
 All Stars
 Allen's
 Alpia (Germany)
 Alpino (Brazil)
 Animal Bar (Junior Parliament international team)
 Bertie Beetle (Australia)
 Besos de Moza (Peru)
 Big Turk (Canada)
 Black Magic
 Blue Riband
 Boci (Hungary)
 Bono (Brazil)
 Bon Pari (Slovakia, Czech Republic, Poland, Russia, Lithuania and Hungary)
 Breakaway
 Cailler
 Capri (Chile)
 Caramac
 Carlos V
 Charge (Brazil)
 Chips Ahoy! (Canada)
 Choclait Chips (Germany, Austria, Switzerland and Netherlands)
 Choco Crossies (Germany)
 Chocolate Surpresa (Brazil)
 Chokito (Brazil, Switzerland, Australia, and New Zealand)
 Coffee Crisp (Canada)
 Crunch (outside the US)
 D'Onofrio (Peru)
 Dairy Box
 Damak (Turkey)
 Drifter
 Fizzfindle
 Frigor
 Galak/Milkybar
 Garoto
 Heaven
 Hercules Bars (Disney)
 Joe (Romania and the Netherlands)
 Joff
 JOJO (Slovakia, Czech Republic and Poland)
 Kit Kat (outside the US)
 Lion
 Lollo (Brazil)
 Mabel's (Bolivia)
 Cracker
 Cremositas
 Gauchitas
 María Maizena
 Moraditas
 Rosquitas
 Salvado
 TOP
 Wafer
 Yapita
 Matchmakers
 Maverick
 Mint Pattie (Australia)
 Mio (Brazil)
 Minties (Australia)
 Mirage
 Moça (Brazil)
 Munch (India and Bangladesh)
 Munchies (United Kingdom)
 Negresco (Brazil)
 Negrita (Chile)
 Nestlé Alpine White
 Nestlé Candy Shop
 Nestlé Classic (Brazil)
 Nestlé Dessert
 Nestlé Milk Chocolate
 Nestlé with Almonds
 Nestlé Wonder Ball
 Nestlé Yes (Germany)
 Nuts (Europe)
 Orion (Slovakia, Czech Republic)
 Passatempo (Brazil)
 Peppermint Crisp (South Africa, Australia, and New Zealand) 
 Perugina Baci
 Plaistowe (Australia)
 Polo
 Prestígio (Chile, Brazil)
 Princessa (Poland)
 Quality Street
 Rolo (outside the US)
 Rowntrees
 Fruit Gums
 Fruit Pastilles
 Jelly Tots
 Juicy Jellies
 Pick & Mix
 Randoms
 Tooty Frooties
 Sahne Nuss (Chile)
Savoy (Venezuela)
Susy
Cocosette
Samba
Carlton
Prestige
Bolero
Galak
Carre
 Scorched Almonds (New Zealand)
 Sensação (Brazil)
 Smarties
 Suflair (Brazil)
 Sublime (Peru)
 Sundy (France)
 Super 8 (Chile)
 Svitoch (Ukraine)
 Szerencsi (Hungary)
 Tango (Ecuador)
 Tango Mini Galletas (Ecuador)
 Texan Bar
 Toffee Crisp
 Tola (UAE)
 Nestlé Toll House cookies
 Trencito (Chile)
 Triangulo (Peru)
 Turtles (UK, Canada) 
 Walnut Whip
 XXX mints
 Yorkie

Foodservice products
 Chef-Mate
 Davigel
 Minor's
 Santa Rica

Frozen food

 Buitoni
 California Pizza Kitchen (US)
 Delissio Pizza (Canada)
 DiGiorno Pizza (US)
 Hot Pockets (US)
 Hälsans Kök (Finland and Sweden)
 Jack's Pizza
 Lean Cuisine
 Lean Pockets 
 Papa Giuseppe
 Stouffer's
 Sweet Earth Foods
 Tombstone Pizza
 Wagner Pizza (EU)

Frozen desserts

 Åhusglass (Sweden)
 Aino (Finland)
 Camy (Spain, Portugal)
 D'Onofrio (Peru)
 Делта (Delta, Bulgaria)
 Δέλτα (Delta, Greece)
 Nestlé Dibs – Produced in conjunction with Dreyer's Ice Cream. Marketed as Edy's in the midwest and eastern United States.
 Dreyer's
 Drumstick
 Eskimo (Finland)
 Extrême (UK, Ireland, France, Spain, Italy, Switzerland)
 Frigor (Argentina)
 Frisco (Switzerland)
 Froneri
 Häagen-Dazs
 Kimo (Egypt)
 Kimy (Philippines)
 Maxibon
 Mat Kool (Malaysia)
 Mivvi
 Motta (Italy)
 Mövenpick (Switzerland)
 Nestlé Ice Cream
 Nestlé Princessa (Poland)
 Oreo Frozen Dessert Sandwiches (Canada)
 Outshine
 Pingviini (Finland)
 Push-Up
 Real Dairy
 Savory (Chile)
 Schöller (Germany and Austria)
 Skinny Cow
 Sorbetes (Philippines)
 Temptations (Philippines)
 Tip Top (New Zealand)
 Twin Pops (Philippines)
 Underground is (Denmark)
 zer0% Fat (Philippines)

Healthcare nutrition

 Atrium Innovations
 Boost
 Carnation Instant Breakfast
 Compleat
 Crucial
 Diabetisource
 Douglas Laboratories
 Fibersource
 Garden of Life
 Genestra brands 
 Glytrol
 Impact
 Isosource
 Meritene
 Modulen
 Nature's Bounty 
 Novasource Renal
 Nutren
 Nuun
 Optifast
 Optifibre
 Orgain
 Osteo Bi-Flex
 Puritan's Pride
 Peptamen
 Persona Nutrition
 Pure Encapsulations
 Resorb
 Resource
 Solgar
 Sustagen 
 Trophic
 Vital Proteins
 Wobenzym

Instant foods

 Alfare
 Beba
 Bona (Finland)
 Cerelac 
 Farinha Láctea (Brazil)
 FM 85
 Freshly 
 Gerber
 Good Start
 Guigoz
 Lactogen
 Maggie
 Mindful Chef 
 Nan Optipro
 NAN Optipro HW
 NanKid
 NanSoy
 NaturNes
 Neslac
 Nestlé
 Nestlé Bear Brand (acquired by infant feeding by Bear Brand Jr. (formerly Bear Brand 1+) in 2001)
 Nestogen
 Nestokid Four
 Nestum (Portugal) (Central America)
 Nido
 Piltti (Finland)
 PreNan
 SMA (UK)
 Wyeth (Bonna, S26)

Performance nutrition
 Neston
 Nesvita
 Pria
 Supligen

Petcare

 Bakers
 Beta 
 Bonio
 Bonnie
 Castor & Pollux
 Chef Michael's Canine Creations
 Felix
 Fido (French equivalent brand to Bakers and Beneful)
 Go Cat
 Gourmet
 Lily's Kitchen
 Lucky Dog
 Merrick
 Mon Petit
 PetLife
 Purina
 Republic of Cats (majority owned by Nestle Purina)
 Supercoat
 Tails .com
 Tidy Cats
 Totalcare
 Whole Earth Farms
 Winalot

Nestlé Purina petcare products
The following products are manufactured by Nestlé Purina.

 Alpo
 Purina Beggin' Strips
 Busy Bone
 Beneful
 Cat Chow
 Dog Chow
 Fancy Feast
 Friskies
 Mighty Dog
 Purina
 Purina ONE
 Purina Pro Plan

Refrigerated products
 Buitoni
 Garden Gourmet (Germany)
 Herta
 Katie's Pizza 
 Toll House – refrigerated cookie dough

Seasonings

 Carpathia
 CHEF.
 Haoji
 Maggi
 Thomy
 Totole
 Winiary

Shelf stable
 Carnation (acquired by Alaska Milk Corporation in 2007, but under a long-term license agreement with Nestlé in the Philippines)
 Coffee-Mate
Milo
 Nestlé Omega Plus – a milk product
 Tendre Noix

Yogurt

 Acti-V (Philippines)
 ActiPlus (Pakistan)
 Fruit Selection Yogurt (Philippines)
 Hirz (Switzerland)
 Longa Vida (Portugal)
 Molico (Brazil)
 Munch Bunch
 Nestlé Raita (mint and cumin) (Pakistan)
 Rawaytee Maza (Pakistan)
 Ski Dairy (United Kingdom)
 Sweet N Tasty Yogurt (Pakistan)
 Yelly (mango and strawberry) (Pakistan)

As shareholder
 Nestlé owns 23.29% of L'Oréal, the world's largest cosmetics and beauty company, whose brands include Garnier, Maybelline, Lancôme and Urban Decay.
 Nestlé owned 100% of Alcon  in 1978. In 2002 Nestlé sold 23.2% of its Alcon shares on the New York Stock Exchange. In 2008 Nestlé sold 24.8% of existing Alcon shares to the Swiss pharmaceutical giant Novartis. In 2010 Nestlé sold the remaining 52% of its Alcon shares to Novartis. Novartis paid a total of 39.1 bn USD.

Former brands
This is a selected list of the former brands formerly owned, discontinued, or sold to another company by Nestlé. Overall, Nestlé has discontinued, sold, or changed the name of many of its brands. Former brands are categorized by their targeted markets.

Beverages
 Farine Lactée – baby formula invented by Henri Nestlé and introduced in 1867
 Juicy Juice - sold to Brynwood Partners
 Magnolia Nestlé – formerly From: Nestlé Magnolia dairy products in the Philippines
 Quik – name changed to Nesquik
 Nestlé Quik – name changed to Nesquik

Bottled water
Many North American brands are now owned and marketed by BlueTriton Brands.

 Aberfoyle (Ontario, Canada)
 Arrowhead (US)
 Calistoga (US)
 Deep Spring (California)
 Deer Park (US)
 Fruity Water (US)
 Ice Mountain (US)
 Montclair (Canada)
 Ozarka (US)
 Powwow Water – discontinued
 Pure Life/Pureza Vital/Vie Pure
 Poland Spring (US)
 Theodora
 Zephyrhills (US)

These French mineral water brands were sold to the Ogeu group in France.

 Plancoët
 Quézac
 Saint-Lambert
 Sainte-Alix

Confectionery
 Bit-O-Honey – sold in 2013
 Wonder Ball – sold to Frankford Candy & Chocolate Company; discontinued by Frankford
 Violet Crumble - sold to Robern Menz in 2018
The Willy Wonka Candy Company - Sold to the Ferrero Group in 2018.

Eyecare
 Alcon – sold to Novartis in 2010

Frozen food
 La Cocinera (Spain) – sold to Findus
Hjem-IS (Denmark, Norway) - sold in 2013
Hemglass (Sweden) - Sold to Varsego in 2013
Kotijäätelö

Health and nutrition
 f.a.a – name changed

Petcare
 Fido Freeze – name changed to Frosty Paws
 Pet79 – name changed to Frosty Paws
 SnackAttack – name changed to Beggin' Strips

Shelf-stable
 Branston Pickle (now owned by Mizkan)
 Gale's Honey
 Sarson's Vinegar (sold to Premier Foods but now owned by Mizkan)

References

Further reading
 

Pet food brands
Nestle
Nestle brands